Chrysoarctus is a genus of tardigrades, in the subfamily Halechiniscinae which is part of the family Halechiniscidae. The genus was named and described by Jeanne Renaud-Mornant in 1984.

Species
The genus includes two species:
 Chrysoarctus briandi Renaud-Mornant, 1984
 Chrysoarctus flabellatus (Grimaldi de Zio, D'Addabbo Gallo, Morone De Lucia, Vaccarella & Grimaldi, 1982)

References

Publications
Renaud-Mornant, 1984 : Halechiniscidae (Heterotardigrada) de la campagne Benthedi, Canal du Mozambique. Bulletin from the Muséum National d'Histoire Naturelle Section A: Zoology Biology and Ecological Animals, vol. 6, no 1, p. 67-88.

Tardigrade genera
Halechiniscidae